Nicolás Linares (born 6 March 1996) is an Argentine professional footballer who plays as a midfielder for Central Córdoba SdE on loan from Banfield.

Career
Linares began his career with Estrella del Sur, prior to joining Banfield's system. He was promoted into their senior squad for the 2017–18 Argentine Primera División campaign, making his professional debut at the Estadio Florencio Sola against Belgrano on 25 August 2017. Linares was selected nineteen more times during 2017–18, which included a Copa Libertadores bow in an encounter with Independiente del Valle in January 2018.

On 8 February 2022, Linares joined Central Córdoba SdE on loan until the end of 2022.

Career statistics
.

References

External links

1996 births
Living people
Sportspeople from Buenos Aires Province
Argentine footballers
Association football midfielders
Argentine Primera División players
Club Atlético Banfield footballers
Central Córdoba de Santiago del Estero footballers